Goalball at the 2017 ASEAN Para Games was held at the Malaysian International Trade & Exhibition Centre, Kuala Lumpur.

Medal summary

Medalists

External links
 Goalball Games Results System

2017 ASEAN Para Games
Goalball at the ASEAN Para Games